Spanish Album was an LP album consisting of tracks assembled from previous albums by The Sandpipers, released by A&M Records in 1969. Most of the tracks were Spanish translations of songs better-known in the United States in English.

The October 26, 1968 issue of Billboard Magazine reviewed the album:
This LP comes as no surprise, because the Sandpipers have consistently relied on Latinesque sounds. The only remarkable thing is that it's so excellent - better than expected. "Cuando Sali de Cuba" is here, as is their old hit of "Guantanamera". "Michelle" and "Yesterday," both in Spanish, are tremendous.

The catalog numbers were SP 4159 in the United States and Canada, and AMLS 926 in the United Kingdom. Other international releases included Argentina (A&M A-5013, titled Canción De Amor), Australia (A&M/Summit SRA250-005, different cover), Brazil (A&M 2011), Colombia (A&M/Codiscos CI-19, titled En Español), Ecuador (A&M LP-880007, titled Cantan En Español), El Salvador (A&M SP-4159), Germany (A&M 212 041, titled Sing In Spanish), India (A&M SP 4159), Japan (A&M AML-27), Mexico (A&M AMS-1004, titled Cantan En Español), New Zealand (Horizon HZ 10), Spain (A&M/Hispavox HDA 371–28, titled Todo En Español), and Venezuela (A&M LPS 77308, titled Cantan En Español).  The LP was reissued in 1975 in the UK by A&M/Hamlet (AMLP 8010).

Track listing

Side One 
"Guantanamera" (Joseíto Fernández) 3:14
"La Bamba" (Traditional) 2:45
"Extraños en la Noche (Strangers in the Night)" (Kaempfert/Singleton/Snyder) 2:39
"Llevame a la Luna (Fly Me to the Moon)" (Bart Howard) 1:50
"Cancion de Amor (Wanderlove)" (Mason Williams/C. Mapel) 3:50
"Louie, Louie" (Richard Berry) 2:48

Side Two
"Cuando Salí de Cuba (The Wind Will Change Tomorrow)" (Luis Aguile) 2:38
"Ayer (Yesterday)" (Lennon-McCartney) 2:25
"Michelle" (Lennon–McCartney) 2:54
"Y la Quiero (And I Love Her)" (Lennon–McCartney) 3:22
"Enamorado" (Keith Colley-Paul Rubio) 2:05
"Ojos Españoles" (Spanish Eyes) (Kaempfert/Singleton/Snyder) 1:40

Production
Producer: Tommy LiPuma
Arrangers: Mort Garson, Bob Thompson, Perry Botkin, Jr., Nick DeCaro
Recording Engineer: Henry Lewy
Art Director: Tom Wilkes
Photography: Guy Webster

References

The Sandpipers albums
1969 compilation albums
Albums produced by Tommy LiPuma
A&M Records compilation albums